is a Japanese politician and the current governor of Hiroshima Prefecture in Japan.

Early life and education 
Yuzaki was born October 4, 1965, in Saeki-ku, Hiroshima. He received his B.L. degree from the University of Tokyo in 1990 and his M.B.A. from the Stanford University School of Business in 1995. Yuzaki's paid job was as a part-time teacher at an after-school program to help students pass their admissions exams.

Political career 
Yuzaki served in the Ministry of International Trade and Industry before running for governor of the Hiroshima Prefecture. He was elected governor of the Hiroshima Prefecture on November 8, 2009, as the candidate of the member of the Liberal Democratic Party of Japan (LDP). Yuzaki has identified cultivating a culture of entrepreneurship in Hiroshima as a top priority in his political career.

As governor of Hiroshima, he tried to forge new initiatives in the field of nuclear disarmament. On November 4, 2011, he announced a new plan to formulate a road map for nuclear abolition through the cooperation of former government officials. The project is titled Hiroshima for Global Peace. In the same month, he visited Washington, D.C. and met US National Security Council member Laura Holgate in order to enlist the cooperation of the US government.

In the 2021 Liberal Democratic Party leadership election, Yuzaki endorsed the campaign of Fumio Kishida.

Other activities 
He is a member of the International Advisory Board at the Blavatnik School of Government at the University of Oxford. Yuzaki is known as an avid fan of American barbecue cuisine, which he states is a product of his education at Stanford.

References

External links
 Official site 
 “A Hiroshima for Global Peace” Plan - Formulation Project (from the official website of the Hiroshima Prefectural Government)
 Hiroshima Prefecture’s “Global Peace” Plan

1965 births
Living people
People from Hiroshima
Governors of Hiroshima
University of Tokyo alumni
Stanford Graduate School of Business alumni
Liberal Democratic Party (Japan) politicians